Hernando County Transit (TheBus) is a cooperative effort of the Hernando County Board of County Commissioners, Metropolitan Planning Organization, City of Brooksville, Florida Department of Transportation, Federal Transit Administration and RATP Dev in serving the people of Hernando County with affordable public transportation.

History
Prior to the establishment of TheBus, the only resemblance to public transportation available in Hernando County was a tourist bus company in Brooksville, and a local ParaTransit company, both which were privately owned.

On October 28, 2002, service commenced on the Spring Hill Routes (Red and Blue) serving the greater Spring Hill area. One week later on November 4, 2002, the Brooksville Purple Route commenced service, serving the Brooksville area with a connection to the Spring Hill Routes on SR 50. The system began with 4 buses in Spring Hill and 1 bus in Brooksville. By the 7th day of operation, ridership surpassed the 3rd year projection of 200 trips per day, with ridership of 219 trips. After 22 months of operation, TheBus was averaging 425 to 434 trips per day. The service was only available on weekdays.

Throughout the 2010s, service was further expanded with the additions of the Green Route, extensions of the Purple Route including the systems first connection in Pasco County, and extensive realignments of the Blue and Purple Routes. Service was increased to provide hourly service on all routes. In October 2019, Saturday service was introduced in addition to increases in service hours on weekdays.

Currently the system operates Monday–Friday from approximately 5:30AM until 8:30PM and on Saturdays from 5:30AM until 7:30PM.

There is no Sunday service.

Current Scope of Service
Hernando County Transit (TheBus) operates 4 fixed bus routes throughout Hernando County, including a connection to Pasco County's Public Transit Route 21 via the Purple Route.

Service operates six days a week:

 Monday–Friday 5:30 AM – 8:30 PM
 Saturday 5:30 AM – 7:30 PM

There is no Sunday service, nor service on certain holidays.

Current Routes

Fare Structure
The cash fare to board the bus is $1.25. A reduced fare of 60 cents is available to Medicare card holders, persons with disabilities, and students (with a valid ID). Transfers to other buses (for as many 1-way trips within a 2-hour period, round-trips & stopovers prohibited; no transfer use charge thereafter) are $0.50 and children under 7 with fare-paying rider are free; limit 3. Fare must be paid with exact change.

Additionally, discounted 12- and 18-trip ticket book and monthly passes are available at various branches of the Hernando County Library System, the bookstores of both the Spring Hill and Brooksville locations of Pasco-Hernando State College (Cash, Money Order & Debit/Credit), and Brooksville City Hall (Cash/Money Order Only).

References

External links
Official Site

Bus transportation in Florida
Transportation in Hernando County, Florida
RATP Group